Virgil is a 2005 comedy drama film written and directed by French-Tunisian director Mabrouk El Mechri, his first feature film. It had its first public screening in movie theaters starting September 2005. The film is about the life of a French boxer in the French suburbs.

Synopsis
Every week, Virgil dreams of his father Ernest telling him about his earlier life as a boxer.
And every week he dreams of a crossing glance from a young woman named Margot. This week, his father announces that he will finally come to see his son fight on the boxing ring. One problem: Virgil has not been boxing for the last three years.

Cast
 Jalil Lespert as Virgil
 Léa Drucker as Margot
 Jean-Pierre Cassel as Ernest
 Philippe Nahon as Louis
 Patrick Floersheim as Dunlopillo
 Karim Belkhadra as Sid
 Sami Zitouni as Kader
 Jean-Marie Frin as Mario Taliori
 Tomer Sisley as Dino Taliori
 Jean-Luc Abel as Marcel
 Marc Duret as Man in the kitchen

External links

2005 comedy-drama films
2005 directorial debut films
2005 films
French comedy-drama films
2000s French films